is a Japanese footballer who plays as a defender for Tochigi on loan from Avispa Fukuoka of the J2 League.

Personal life
Mikuni was born in Tokyo to a Nigerian father and a Japanese mother. He attended Aomori Yamada High School in Aomori where he was scouted.

Career statistics

References

External links

2000 births
Living people
Japanese footballers
Japan youth international footballers
Association football defenders
Avispa Fukuoka players
J2 League players
Japanese people of Nigerian descent
Sportspeople of Nigerian descent
J1 League players
Tochigi SC players
Japan under-20 international footballers